AIGEL is a Russian electronic hip-hop duo, consisting of Aigel Gaisina, a poet from Naberezhnye Chelny, and Ilya Baramiya, an electronic musician from Saint Petersburg.

Members

Aigel Gaisina 
Gaisina was born on 9 October 1986 and lives in Naberezhnye Chelny. She is a professional voice actor. 

Gaisina started writing songs in school and first performed on stage when she was 16. She released her debut album, Les, in 2003. In the mid-2000s, she gained recognition as a poet and translator of Tatar poetry in literary magazines. In 2013, Gaisina and Temur Khadyrov formed the experimental electronic group Tak Krasivo Temno.

Ilya Baramiya 
Baramiya was born on 18 June 1973 and lives in Saint Petersburg. He is a sound engineer and producer. Baramiya started making electronic music in 1997 and has been a member of the groups Yolochniye Igrushki, 2H Company, and Samoe Bolshoe Prostoe Chislo. He was the curator of the "Contemporary Music and Sound Design" area at the Mayak School of Creative Industries.

History 
In the fall of 2016, Gaisina contacted Baramiya on social media with the idea of staging a play based on her poetry collection, Sud. Тhe idea evolved as Gaisina and Baramiya worked together, and they ended up forming the group AIGEL. In the beginning of 2017, the group held their first concerts in Moscow and St. Petersburg.

On 10 April 2017, AIGEL released their debut album, 1190. The title refers to Gaisina's partner's sentence, as he was supposed to spend 1190 days in prison.

On 6 August 2017, the EP Bush Bash was released. The title means "empty head" in Tatar.

On 25 August 2017, AIGEL released the music video for "Tatarin", directed by Ilya Soloview. As of October 2017, the video had 1.5 million views on YouTube. As of June 2019, it had been viewed about 40 million times. On 9 October 2017, AIGEL performed "Tatarin" on the late-night talk show Evening Urgant.

In 2018, AIGEL released their second album, Muzyka.

In June 2019, AIGEL released the music video "Chiotkiy", directed by Ilya Soloview and starring Danila Kholodkov from Shortparis.

In August 2019, AIGEL released their third album, Edem.

In March 2020, AIGEL released the music video "You're Born", directed by Andžejs Gavrišs. Andrey Nikolaev, won the cinematography in a music video award at EnergaCamerimage Film Festival for his work on "You're Born".

In August 2020, AIGEL contributed a track to the compilation album For Belarus, intended to support victims of repression in Belarus in connection with the 2020 protests, with proceeds from the album's sales going to the Belarus Solidarity Foundation. 

In November 2020, AIGEL released their fourth album, Pyjala. All of the songs on Pyyala are in Tatar. The title means "Glass" in Tatar.

Musical style 
The group's lyrics mainly describe Gaisina's personal experiences related to her partner's trial and imprisonment and the expectation of his release. Since Gaisina and Baramiya live in different cities, most of their collaboration occurs remotely. Baramiya sends beats to Gaisina, and Gaisina writes lyrics and records her vocals. The musicians had not met in person or even spoken on the phone until their first concert.

Most of AIGEL's songs were written by Gaisina specifically for performance to music, but some of the lyrics come from poems written earlier and then adapted to music. Baramiya has cited Run the Jewels as an influence.

Discography

Studio albums 

 1190 (2017)
 Muzyka(2018)
 Edem (2019)
 Pyyala (2020)

EPs 

 Bush Bash (2017)
 RMX (2017)
 Ofigeno (2020)

Guest appearances 

 "Voodoo Doll" — Velial Squad featuring AIGEL, from the 2019 album Golovu na plakhu

Music videos 

 "Tatarin" (25 August 2017)
 "1190" (5 December 2017)
 "Prints na belom" (15 May 2018)
 "Dukhi ognya" (5 October 2018)
 "Chetkii" (7 June 2019)
 "Sneg" (6 September 2019)
 "Ono vydelyalo teplo" (lyric video) (26 December 2019) 
 "You're Born" (12 March 2020)
 "Dve nedeli" (10 April 2020)

Awards and nominations 
{| class="wikitable sortable plainrowheaders" 
|-
! scope="col" | Award
! scope="col" | Year
! scope="col" | Nominee(s)
! scope="col" | Category
! scope="col" | Result
! scope="col" class="unsortable"| 
|-
!scope="row" rowspan=4|Austin Music Video Festival
| rowspan=4|2021
| rowspan=4|"You're Born"
| Best Cinematography
| 
| rowspan=4|
|-
| Best Director
| 
|-
| Best Narrative
| 
|-
| Video of the Year
| 
|-
!scope="row" rowspan=3|Berlin Music Video Awards
| rowspan=2|2018
| "Tatarin"
| Best Editor
| 
| 
|-
| "1190"
| Best Cinematography
| 
| 
|-
| 2020
| "You're Born"
| Best Director
| 
| 

At the 2017 Jager Music Awards, AIGEL won Video of the Year for "Tatarin".

References

External links 

 AIGEL discography at Discogs
AIGEL on Bandcamp

Russian electronic music groups
Electronic music groups
Russian hip hop
Russian hip hop groups
Russian hip hop musicians